Doros is a village in the Limassol District of Cyprus, located 1 km north of Monagri.

Doros in Greek or Thoros in English is the name of the village, which is situated on a hill of 470 metres. It is hidden and surrounded by almond trees and grape vines. Doros is 25 km outside Limassol on the left side of the main road if you are travelling towards Troodos.

The name Doros is associated with the ancient Greek word doris, which means forest. The 150 or so residents are all farmers tending their livestock and all the fruit orchards. The restoration on many houses, the traditional coffee shop, the immigration union with the many cultural festivities that it organises in association with the municipal board, proves that Doros is a community full of life. This is a good reminder of the good old days, prior to the problem of urbanization.

At the beginning of July 2002, an ancient tomb was discovered and was handed over to the Antiques Department.

Among other Cypriot villages Doros has made a name for itself for the best quality of its grapes, which makes a first-class Koumandaria and Zivania that is very popular with the locals.

People visiting that village will get to recognize what hospitality really means when going in Doros and meeting the friendly villagers. Any visitor will enjoy walking in the narrow little streets of this village without the noise of traffic. Admire the original stone-built houses, the village community park that is surrounded by pine trees, the windmill and the very old water pump that still provides excellent drinking water. Above all there is that beautiful church built in the 14th and 15th centuries and it is called Panagia Galaktotrofousas, which was dedicated to Christ's mother.

References

Communities in Limassol District